The Foundation for Universal Responsibility of His Holiness the Dalai Lama is a non-profit organization established with the Nobel Peace Prize awarded to the 14th Dalai Lama in 1989. According to its website, "the Foundation brings together men and women of different faiths, professions and nationalities, through a range of initiatives and mutually sustaining collaborations."

Women in Security, Conflict Management and Peace (WISCOMP) is an initiative of the Foundation. WISCOMP also conducts initiatives for peacebuilding in Jammu and Kashmir, as well as between India and Pakistan.

Rajiv Mehrotra is a Trustee/Secretary of the Foundation.

References

External links
Official website

Non-profit organisations based in India
14th Dalai Lama
India–Tibet relations
Tibetan diaspora in India